Ursula Kadan (born 7 April 1988) is an Austrian orienteering competitor. At the World Games in 2013 she won a bronze medal in the mixed relay, together with Gernot Kerschbaumer, Robert Merl and Anna Nilsson Simkovics.

References

External links

1988 births
Living people
Austrian orienteers
Female orienteers
Foot orienteers
World Games bronze medalists

Competitors at the 2013 World Games
Competitors at the 2017 World Games
World Games medalists in orienteering